Przyrów  is a village in Częstochowa County, Silesian Voivodeship, in southern Poland. It is the seat of the gmina (administrative district) called Gmina Przyrów. The village has a population of 1,222. Przyrów is part of historic province of Lesser Poland, and for centuries it belonged to Kraków Voivodeship. It was a town between 1369 and 1869.

Przyrów received Magdeburg rights town charter from King Kazimierz Wielki, in the year 1369, in a location of the village of Komorów. Following other medieval towns of Europe, Przyrów had a market square, and several streets. Its first wójt was Jakub Rechicki of Nagłowice, and town's privileges were confirmed by several other Polish kings. In the 14th century Przyrów emerged as an important center of beer production. Until the Partitions of Poland, the town was part of Lelów County, Kraków Voivodeship. It was a royal town, with a voigt and a council. In 1620, it had 136 houses, and prospered together with whole Lesser Poland (see Polish Golden Age).

On November 8, 1655, Przyrów was completely destroyed in the Swedish invasion of Poland, and the town never recovered from the destruction. After the invasion, the number of still existing houses was reduced to 55, and the population shrank to 330. In early November 1655, Swedish troops under General Burchard Müller von der Luhnen (who also commanded the Siege of Jasna Góra) demanded large amounts of bread, oats, meats, beer, butter and hay. Since residents of Przyrów did not have enough goods, von der Luhnen ordered the destruction of the town.

In 1793 Przyrów was annexed by the Kingdom of Prussia, as part of New Silesia. In 1807 it belonged to the Duchy of Warsaw, which in 1815 became Russian-controlled Congress Poland. In the early 19th century Przyrów had 222 houses and the population of app. 1,200. After January Uprising, Russian government turned it into a village. By 1880, the population grew to almost 2,500, with a 40% Jewish minority. In the Second Polish Republic and in 1945 - 1950, Przyrów belonged to Kielce Voivodeship. Since 1950, it has been administratively tied with either Katowice, or Częstochowa.

References

External links 
 Jewish Community in Przyrów on Virtual Shtetl

Villages in Częstochowa County
Kraków Voivodeship (14th century – 1795)
Piotrków Governorate
Kielce Voivodeship (1919–1939)